The Secretary of State for War, commonly called War Secretary, was a secretary of state in the Government of the United Kingdom, which existed from 1794 to 1801 and from 1854 to 1964. The Secretary of State for War headed the War Office and was assisted by a Parliamentary Under-Secretary of State for War, a Parliamentary Private Secretary who was also a Member of Parliament (MP), and a Military Secretary, who was a general.

History
The position of Secretary of State for War was first held by Henry Dundas who was appointed in 1794. In 1801 the post became that of Secretary of State for War and the Colonies.  The position of Secretary of State for War was re-instated in 1854 when the Secretary of State for the Colonies was created as a separate position.

In the nineteenth century the post was twice held by future prime minister Henry Campbell-Bannerman. At the outset of the First World War, prime minister H. H. Asquith was filling the role, but he quickly appointed Lord Kitchener, who became famous while in this position for Lord Kitchener Wants You. He was replaced by David Lloyd George, who went on to become prime minister. Between the World Wars, the post was held by future prime minister Winston Churchill for two years. 

In 1946, the three posts of Secretary of State for War, First Lord of the Admiralty, and Secretary of State for Air became formally subordinated to that of Minister of Defence, which had itself been created in 1940 for the co-ordination of defence and security issues.

In the 1960s, John Profumo held this post at the time of the Profumo affair.

On 1 April 1964, with the creation of a new united Ministry of Defence headed by the Secretary of State for Defence, the three service ministries as well as the post of Minister of Defence as created in 1940 were abolished.

List of Secretaries of State for War

Secretary of State for War, 1794–1801

For 1801–1854 see Secretary of State for War and the Colonies.

Secretaries of State for War, 1854–1964

See also
Secretary at War

References

External links

War
Defunct ministerial offices in the United Kingdom
History of the British Army
1794 establishments in Great Britain
1964 disestablishments in the United Kingdom
War Office
War Office in World War II